Summit Meeting may refer to:

Summit Meeting (Elvin Jones album), 1976
"Summit Meeting" (Voltron), 1984
Summit Meeting (Eric Alexander album), 2001